Jean Vallerand, CQ (December 24, 1915 – June 24, 1994) was a composer, music critic, violinist, conductor, arts administrator, writer, and music educator from Quebec. As a composer he was active from 1935 to 1969. An associate of the Canadian Music Centre, he was appointed a Knight of the National Order of Quebec in 1991.

Life
Born in Montreal, Quebec, Vallerand began studying the violin at age 5 with Lucien Sicotte, with whom he continued to study until he was 20. He entered the Université de Montréal in 1934 where he studied classical literature, earning a diploma there in 1938. While there he pursued private studies in music theory and music composition with Claude Champagne from 1935–1942.

Vallerand began his career as a music critic in 1941 when he succeeded Léo-Pol Morin as critic at Le Canada. He remained there through 1946, going on to hold posts as music critic at Montréal-Matin (1948–1949), Le Devoir (1952–1961), Le Nouveau Journal (1961–1962), and La Presse (1962–1966). He also reviewed cultural events for CBC Radio and CBC Television during the 1940s through the 1960s. He contributed articles to numerous periodicals and journals, including L'Action universitaire, Amérique francaise, Culture vivante, Gants du ciel, Liberté, Maclean, Musical America, Relations, and Vie musicale. He also worked as the program annotator for the Montreal Symphony Orchestra for many years appeared numerous times as a host for the French-language version of the Metropolitan Opera radio broadcasts.

In 1942 Vallerand was appointed Secretary General of the newly formed Conservatoire de musique du Québec à Montréal (CMQM) by Wilfrid Pelletier. He remained in that post and taught orchestration at the school up through 1963. He also taught concurrently on the music faculty of the Université de Montréal from 1950–1966. From 1963–1956 he served as the head of the Montreal branch of CBC Radio and from 1966–1970 he was the Quebec Government's cultural attaché in Paris.

In 1971 Vallerand became the head of the Conservatoire de musique et d'art dramatique du Québec (CMADQ) which at that time oversaw 8 conservatories in higher education in music and theatre in Québec. He remained in that position through 1978, during which time he was instrumental in establishing a 9th conservatoire, the Conservatoire de musique du Québec à Rimouski, in 1973. He also served concurrently as the director of music education for the Ministère des Affaires culturelles du Québec (MACQ) in 1971, and was then repositioned as director of performing arts for the organization from 1971 though 1975. In 1977–1978 he was secretary general of the Orchestre des jeunes du Québec. He also worked as a consultant for the CMQM and the MACQ throughout the 1970s. He retired in 1980.

Selected works 
Les Roses à la mer, 1935
Le Diable dans le beffroi, 1942
Nocturne, 1946
Prélude, 1948
Sonata for Violin and Piano, 1950
Concerto for Orchestra, 1951
Quatre Poèmes de Saint-Denys Garneau, 1954
String Quartet, 1955
Réverbérations contractoires, 1961
Le Magicien, opera, 1961
Payse, Ballett, 1964
Étude concertante for Violin and Orchestra, 1969

References

1915 births
1994 deaths
Canadian classical composers
Male conductors (music)
Canadian music critics
Canadian classical violinists
Male classical violinists
Academic staff of the Conservatoire de musique du Québec à Montréal
Canadian music educators
Musicians from Montreal
Knights of the National Order of Quebec
Composers awarded knighthoods
Conductors (music) awarded knighthoods
Musicians awarded knighthoods
Canadian opera composers
20th-century Canadian conductors (music)
20th-century classical violinists
20th-century classical composers
Canadian male classical composers
20th-century Canadian composers
20th-century Canadian male musicians
20th-century Canadian violinists and fiddlers
Canadian male violinists and fiddlers